Butch Walts (born June 4, 1955) is a former professional tennis player from the United States. 

During his career, Walts won 4 singles titles and 15 doubles titles. He achieved a career-high singles ranking of world No. 32 in 1979 and a career-high doubles ranking of world No. 23 in 1984.

Career finals

Singles (4 titles, 1 runner-up)

Doubles (14 titles, 8 runner-ups)

Notes

References

External links
 
 

American male tennis players
Sportspeople from Modesto, California
Sportspeople from Arizona
Tennis people from California
USC Trojans men's tennis players
1955 births
Living people
Pan American Games medalists in tennis
Pan American Games gold medalists for the United States
Tennis players at the 1975 Pan American Games